XHIG-FM is a radio station on 106.5 FM in Iguala, Guerrero. It is known as La Grande de Iguala.

History
XEIG-AM 1430 received its concession on August 6, 1960. It was owned by Rafael Cutberto Navarro and affiliated to his Radio Cadena Nacional, broadcasting with 1,000 watts during the day and 100 at night. In 1964, Cutberto Navarro placed the station under the control of Radio Iguala, S.A. The 1990s saw XEIG move to 880 kHz and begin broadcasting with 2.5 kW day and 1 kW night. Today's RCN still owns the station.

XEIG was cleared for AM-FM migration in 2010 as XHIG-FM 106.5.

References

Radio stations in Guerrero
Radio stations established in 1960